Consuelo Mack (née Cotter, born 30 November 1949 in New York, New York) is an American business news journalist and host of  WealthTrack, a news program presented by WLIW-TV in New York City, distributed by American Public Television, and aired weekly, primarily on PBS-TV station affiliates. 

Before developing WealthTrack, she spent over a decade at The Wall Street Journal as the Anchor and Managing Editor of The Wall Street Journal Report, since hosted by Maria Bartiromo and Rebecca Quick. During her tenure, it won the Overseas Press Club award.

Early life and education
Mack grew up in Weston, Massachusetts, and studied at the Concord Academy. 

She attended Sarah Lawrence College and graduated in 1972 with a bachelor's degree in English Literature, History, and Political Science. 

After college, Mack was a trainee in the account-executive program of Merrill Lynch, Pierce, Fenner & Smith, stockbrokers. 

In 1974, she married lawyer Walter Staunton Mack, Jr.

References

External links
Consuelo Mack bio sketch at WealthTrack Website
American journalist Consuelo Mack interviews Bill Gross of PIMCO

Television anchors from New York City
1949 births
Sarah Lawrence College alumni
American reporters and correspondents
Living people
CNBC people
The Wall Street Journal people